Purdy Hill is an unincorporated community in Posey Township, Clay County, Indiana. It is part of the Terre Haute Metropolitan Statistical Area.

It was likely named for the Purdy family.

Geography

References

Unincorporated communities in Clay County, Indiana
Unincorporated communities in Indiana
Terre Haute metropolitan area